Shenandoah West is a Roanoke, Virginia neighborhood located in west Roanoke south of U.S. 460 (Melrose Avenue). It borders the neighborhoods of South Washington Heights, Wilmont and Cherry Hill on the west, Loudon-Melrose on the east, Villa Heights on the north and Hurt Park on the south opposite the Norfolk Southern rail yard.

History 
The Shenandoah West neighborhood had developed since the mid-20th century and is dominated by industrial uses at its southern fringe with the remainder of residential and commercial development typical of that of contemporary suburban. The area is also the location of the Lansdowne and
Melrose Towers public housing projects.

References

External links
 Loudon-Melrose/Shenandoah West Neighborhood Plan

Neighborhoods in Roanoke, Virginia